Lo Scolmatore dell'Arno (The Arno floodway) is a  artificial flood control channel of the river Arno from Pontedera to the Ligurian Sea at Calambrone. As a consequence of the Arno flood of 1949, it was decided to start the construction of Scolmatore dell'Arno in 1954 at a cost of more than 10 billion lire of the time. The work was not completed in time for the disastrous flood of 1966 that, in addition to Florence, caused enormous damages in Pontedera and Pisa.

The floodway branches off the Arno 40 km from the river mouth ( off the coast), just downstream Pontedera in a southwesterly direction, where the Arno proper continues towards northwest.

Scolmatore dell'Arno has a few branches, most notably is the much older Navicelli channel that connects less than one km from the mouth, although they lie parallel for further  before this channel turns towards northwest. Another few channels drain the area between Arno proper and the floodway. The main tributary is the River Tora that converges  from the mouth, just northwest of Mortaiolo. A minor tributary is the River Zannone that converges  from the mouth, just downstream the aforementioned bend of the channel. It is likely that the lower part of the channel at least partly occupies the original paths of Tora and Zannone. Both these rivers originates from the Pisan hills south of the Arno valley and the channel itself.

A related problem is silt deposits of the seaport of Livorno that lies adjacent to the floodway's mouth.

Plans for future navigability of the channel
There is an ongoing project to improve the navigability of the channel, intended exclusively for freight, excluding the use of  tourist boating on the channel.

The project also includes the raising of the deck of the bridge of the Aurelia road (by Stagno) and the construction of docks for loading and unloading of goods at Guasticce and Vicarello.

References

Buildings and structures in the Province of Pisa
Canals in Italy